Yamo has multiple meanings.

Yamo, a musical project by Wolfgang Flür and Mouse on Mars
The Green Yamo, an enemy character in the computer game Bruce Lee